Kandeh Sureh (also Romanized as Kandeh Sūreh) is a village in Beleh Keh Rural District, Alut District, Baneh County, Kurdistan Province, Iran. At the 2006 census, its population was 645, in 123 families. The village is populated by Kurds.

References 

Towns and villages in Baneh County
Kurdish settlements in Kurdistan Province